Crazy Moon is a 1987 film written by Tom Berry and Stefan Wodoslawsky, directed by Allan Eastman, starring Kiefer Sutherland and Vanessa Vaughan.

Plot
Brooks is a rich but slightly odd teenager who has various adventures as his older brother leads him astray. His life changed after he met a girl, Anne, who is deaf. They met as Brooks was stealing a mannequin from a clothes store where she worked as a clerk. They fall in love.  The story follows their relationship as each of them learn from the others strengths and weaknesses.

Cast
Kiefer Sutherland as Brooks 
Vanessa Vaughan as Anne 
Peter Spence as Cleveland 
Ken Pogue as Alec 
Eve Napier as Mimi 
Sean McCann as Anne's Father 
Bronwen Mantel as Anne's Mother 
Terri Hawkes as Pamela

See also

List of films featuring the deaf and hard of hearing

References

External links

1987 films
1987 comedy-drama films
Canadian comedy-drama films
English-language Canadian films
Films directed by Allan Eastman
1980s English-language films
1980s Canadian films
Films about disability